Syed Mehdi Ahmed Roomy is a Bangladesh Nationalist Party politician and the former Member of Parliament of Kushtia-4.

Career
Roomy was elected to parliament from Kushtia-4 as a Bangladesh Nationalist Party candidate in 1996 and 2001. He is an adviser to former Prime Minister and Chairperson of Bangladesh Nationalist Party, Khaleda Zia. He is the President of Kushtia District unit of Bangladesh Nationalist Party.

References

Bangladesh Nationalist Party politicians
Living people
7th Jatiya Sangsad members
8th Jatiya Sangsad members
Year of birth missing (living people)